Aphyosemion elegans, the elegant killifish, is a species of African rivulines (Nothobranchiidae) endemic to Africa, where it is found in the basin of the Congo River.

References

External links 
 
 Aphyosemion elegans at FishBase

elegans
Freshwater fish of Africa
Fish described in 1899
Taxa named by George Albert Boulenger